, also known as Smart-san or Mademoiselle Anne, is a Japanese shōjo manga series by Waki Yamato. It was serialized by Kodansha in the magazine Shōjo Friend from 1975 to 1977. The title can be literally translated into English as Here Comes Miss Modern, Here Comes Miss High-Collar ("haikara" being the Japanese version of "high collar"), or Fashionable Girl Passing By. In 1977, it was awarded the 1st Kodansha Manga Award for shojo.

The series was later adapted as a 42-episode anime television series produced by Nippon Animation, which aired in Japan on TV Asahi in Tokyo and other local stations across the country from June 3, 1978, to March 31, 1979. The anime was later rebroadcast across Japan on the anime satellite television network Animax and on NHK satellite channel BS2. The manga was also adapted into three television drama specials and theatrical film. Two new anime films have been released, with the first film on 2017, and the second film in 2018. In 2017, the story was also adapted for the musical theatre of the Takarazuka Revue.

Plot
One day, Benio has a series of embarrassing encounters with the handsome army lieutenant Shinobu Ijuin (voiced by: Katsuji Mori).

Benio encounters Shinobu again when she arrives home that day, and promptly attacks him with her kendo stick, only to receive a shock when her father (voiced by: Ichiro Nagai) tells her that Shinobu is to be her husband, due to a pact made between the Hanamura and Ijuin families before Benio's birth.

Since Benio's friend Tamaki is in love with Shinobu, Benio also wants out of the engagement to avoid hurting Tamaki.

Moved by this unexpected show of kindness, Benio decides to forget Shinobu and accept Tosei's proposal of marriage.

Lalissa is fatally injured in the quake trying to save Shinobu, and as she lies dying, she tells Shinobu to marry Benio and be happy.

Tosei tries to save Benio, but Benio refuses, preferring to die alongside her beloved rather than face life without him; thus, Tosei rescues both Benio and Shinobu.

In the end, Tosei comes to terms with his feelings about his mother and rededicates himself to his business; Onijima returns to Manchuria, and Tamaki decides to obey her heart and follow him; and Benio and Shinobu are wed at last.

Distribution

The manga was serialized in Kodansha's Shōjo Friend magazine in Japan from 1975 to 1977.  It remains a popular nostalgia item in Japan to this day, considered a classic work from the same 1970s shōjo manga boom that gave birth to such popular titles as Candy Candy, and copies are still in print.  The anime adaptation of the story, which aired across Japan on the terrestrial TV Asahi network from June 1978 to March 1979, spanned 42 episodes, was directed by Kazuyoshi Yokota (Spaceship Sagittarius, Grimm's Fairy Tale Classics, My Daddy-Long-Legs), and featured character designs by future Ranma 1/2 director Tsutomu Shibayama.

Due to disappointing ratings, Nippon Animation was forced to end the series early and craft an ending to the anime that was different from that of the manga, cutting the story off after the arrival of Shinobu and Lalissa in Japan. In the final episode, Benio is told that the mysterious Russian count is not Shinobu (Lalissa has a photograph of their wedding day to prove it). However, an epilogue narration reveals that Lalissa found Shinobu in Siberia. He was severely hurt, and was the spitting image of her late husband. The final episode concludes with Benio finally being reunited with Shinobu. Up until this point, the anime had been a very faithful adaptation of the manga, even incorporating redrawn stills from Yamato's original work (although the anime portrayed Benio with reddish-brown hair, and Yamato's colorized drawings often showed her as blonde).

The anime has been discovered by new audiences in the years since thanks to the enduring popularity of the original manga (as well as a live-action movie version of the story released in Japan in 1987).  In 2005, Haikara-san ga Tooru was listed at #95 in a TV Asahi poll of the top 100 animation series of all time, based on a nationwide survey of Japanese of all age groups. The anime has also been aired across Japan by the anime satellite television network, Animax, and the NHK satellite channel BS2.

Both the manga and anime have also enjoyed considerable success in the European market.  The manga was released in Italy in the late 1990s under the title Una ragazza alla moda (A Fashionable Girl).  The anime was successful on Italian TV in 1986 under the title Mademoiselle Anne, and a French dub of the series, Marc et Marie, aired on French TV in 1995.  The anime has also been dubbed into Arabic, under the title Pino (the Arabic name for Benio).  Nippon Animation's official English title for the anime is Smart-san.

Two-part anime film adaptations have been announced with the first film being released in Japan on November 11, 2017, while the second film on October 19, 2018 by covering latter story of the original manga series, which was not told in the 42-episode anime television series in 1978–1979.  Eleven Arts has released the first film in theaters in the U.S. and Canada and on Blu-ray in partnership with Right Stuf. The second film has also licensed by Eleven Arts.

1978–1979 anime television series
 Director: Kazuyoshi Yokota
 Script: Nizo Takahashi
 Storyboards: Hiroshi Yoshida, Teppei Matsuura
 Music: Masuhiro Yamaguchi
 Original Story: Waki Yamato
 Character Design: Tsutomu Shibayama
 Animation Directors: Eiji Kawakita, Eiji Tanaka, Takashi Saijo, Tatsuhiro Nagaki, Yoshiyuki Kishi
 Background Art: Kazu Setouchi, Takafumi Kase
 Executive Producer: Koichi Motohashi
 Theme Songs: OP - Haikara-san ga Tōru, ED - Gokigen Ikaga? Benio desu, performed by Shosuke Sekita

The theme song for the late 1980s movie was performed by Yoko Minamino; it is a different song from that used in the anime series.

2017–2018 anime films

Staff
 Director: Kazuhiro Furuhashi (first film), Seimei Kidokoro (second film) 
 Script: Kazuhiro Furuhashi
 Original Story: Waki Yamato
 Character Designer: Terumi Nishii
 Background Designer, Art Director: Kentaro Akiyama
Color Designer: Kunio Tsujita
Photography: Takeo Ogiwara (Graphinica)
Sound Director: Kazuhiro Wakabayashi
Music: Michiru Oshima 
Animation Production: Nippon Animation

Cast

Saori Hayami performed the theme song . Mariya Takeuchi composed the theme song and also wrote the lyrics, with arrangement by Takeshi Masuda. Hayami also performed the theme song for the second film, also composed by Takeuchi.

Takarazuka Revue

Naoko Koyanagi adapted the story for musical theatre for the all-female Takarazuka Revue. She directed the Flower Troupe in performances in October 2017 and July to November 2020. In both performances, Rei Yuzuka was cast as Shinobu Ijuin and Yuuki Hana was cast as the title role, Benio Hanamura. The 2020 performance was Rei Yuzuka's Grand Theater debut as top star of the Flower Troupe; while it was originally scheduled for March 2020, it was delayed and rescheduled due to government COVID-19 restrictions.

References

External links

Animax's official site for Haikara-san ga Tōru 
 Anime film official site
 Nippon Animation's list of works, with a section for Smart-san (Haikara-san ga Tōru)
 

1975 manga
1978 anime television series debuts
1987 films
Anime series based on manga
Historical anime and manga
Japanese animated films
Japanese television dramas based on manga
1980s Japanese-language films
Kodansha manga
Live-action films based on manga
Manga adapted into films
Marriage in anime and manga
Nippon Animation
Romantic comedy anime and manga
Shōjo manga
Taishō period in fiction
TV Asahi original programming
Winner of Kodansha Manga Award (Shōjo)